The following sortable table lists the 3,242 counties and county equivalents of the United States and their respective FIPS codes.

Table

See also

 Outline of the United States
 Index of United States-related articles
 Index of U.S. counties
 Lists of counties in the United States
 List of former United States counties
 List of FIPS state codes
 Statistical area (United States)
 Combined statistical area (list)
 Core-based statistical area (list)
 Metropolitan statistical area (list)
 Micropolitan statistical area (list)

Notes

References

External links
 United States Government
 United States Census Bureau
 United States Office of Management and Budget

Counties and county equivalents
Equivalents
County equivalents
Counties and county equivalents